Georgia Amanda Elwiss (born 31 May 1991) is an English cricketer who currently plays for Sussex, Southern Vipers, Birmingham Phoenix and England.

Career
She was raised in Wolverhampton with her brother Luke and is a right-arm medium fast bowler and right-handed batsman.  She has played for the Diamonds in the UK and gained experience with ACT Women in Australia in the 2010/11 season.  She was picked for the England one day tour of South Africa in October 2011 and made her one-day international debut for England against South Africa at Potchefstroom on 23 October 2011. She made her Twenty/20 debut on the same tour at Potchefstroom on 30 Oct 2011.

Elwiss attended Wolverhampton Girls' High School from 2002 until 2009, and went on to study at Loughborough University and then on to Loughborough MCC University

She is the holder of one of the first tranche of 18 ECB central contracts for women players, which were announced in April 2014.

In April 2015, she was named as one of the England women's Academy squad tour to Dubai, where England women will play their Australian counterparts in two 50-over games, and two Twenty20 matches.

Elwiss was a member of the winning women's team at the 2017 Women's Cricket World Cup held in England.

In November 2018, she was named in the Melbourne Stars' squad for the 2018–19 Women's Big Bash League season. In February 2019, she was awarded a full central contract by the England and Wales Cricket Board (ECB) for 2019. In January 2020, she was named in England's squad for the 2020 ICC Women's T20 World Cup in Australia.

On 18 June 2020, Elwiss was named in a squad of 24 players to begin training ahead of international women's fixtures starting in England following the COVID-19 pandemic. In June 2021, Elwiss was named as in England's Test squad for their one-off match against India. Ahead of the inaugural season of The Hundred, Elwiss was signed by the Birmingham Phoenix.

In December 2021, Elwiss was named in England's A squad for their tour to Australia, with the matches being played alongside the Women's Ashes. In April 2022, she was bought by the Birmingham Phoenix for the 2022 season of The Hundred.

Personal life 
Elwiss is in a relationship with England women's national football team goalkeeper Carly Telford.

References

External links

1991 births
Living people
England women Test cricketers
England women One Day International cricketers
England women Twenty20 International cricketers
People educated at Wolverhampton Girls' High School
People from Wolverhampton
Staffordshire women cricketers
Sussex women cricketers
Loughborough Lightning cricketers
Southern Vipers cricketers
Melbourne Stars (WBBL) cricketers
ACT Meteors cricketers
Lesbian sportswomen
LGBT cricketers
English LGBT sportspeople
Birmingham Phoenix cricketers